Walther Braithwaite (18 November 1933 – 7 January 2018) was a former Surinamese football manager and player who played as a midfielder and left back in the Surinamese Hoofdklasse for S.V. Transvaal and S.V. Voorwaarts. He also managed the Suriname national team for the nations 1978 and 1986 FIFA World Cup qualifying campaigns, finishing in eighth place in the finals in Mexico in the 1978 edition.

He was also a former cricket player and winner of three gold medals, who played for cricket club Rood-Wit in the Netherlands.

Football career

Early career
Braithwaite was born and raised in the Nickerie District, Suriname where he joined local football club VV Robinhood (not to be confused with the club S.V. Robinhood from Paramaribo of the same name).

SV Transvaal
At age 17 he moved to Paramaribo and joined S.V. Transvaal. Becoming a key player on the first team, he would go on to play for the team for six seasons, while winning the national championship in 1951, before opting to play for S.V. Voorwaarts instead.

SV Voorwaarts
In 1956 Braithwaite joined S.V. Voorwaarts where he was moved from his usual midfield position to playing left back. In 1957 he helped the club to its fourth national championship and his personal second in the league.

Cricket career

RKSV Rood-Wit
In 1966 he joined RKSV Rood-Wit playing in the Topklasse, the top flight of cricket in the Netherlands.

Managerial career
In 1976 Braithwaite took over the managerial position on the Suriname national team, with Ro Kolf as his assistant he would help the team to an eighth place finish in the finals of the nations 1978 FIFA World Cup qualifying campaign. In 1985, he took over as manager of the national team once more, failing to qualify for the 1986 FIFA World Cup after being eliminated in the qualifying rounds by Honduras.

Honours 
S.V. Transvaal
 Hoofdklasse: 1951

S.V. Voorwaarts
 Hoofdklasse: 1957

References 

2018 deaths
1933 births
Surinamese footballers
Surinamese football managers
Suriname national football team managers
S.V. Transvaal players
S.V. Voorwaarts players
SVB Eerste Divisie players
Association football midfielders
Association football fullbacks